Quito is the capital city of Ecuador and the seat of the Quito canton.

Quito may also refer to:

Places
 Quito Canton, Pichincha Province, Ecuador
 Municipality of Quito, the governing body of the city of Quito, Ecuador and the canton that shares its name
 Quito, Mississippi, United States
 Quito Square, a public square in Bucharest, Romania
 Río Quito, a town and municipality in Choco Department, Colombia

Other uses
 Deportivo Quito, an Ecuadorian professional football club
Emerita S. Quito (1926–2017), Filipino philosopher, historian and author
 "Quito", a song by The Mountain Goats on the album We Shall All Be Healed
 Quito, the nickname of André Raposo, a Brazilian water polo player